Memories Are My Only Witness is an album by Yuka Honda.

Track listing
 "Small Circular Motion" 
 "Why Do We Distrust The Machines We Made?"
 "You Think You Are So Generous But It’s The Most Conditional “Anything” I’ve Ever Heard"
 "Driving Down By The Hudson River, We Saw The Blood Red Burning Sky"
 "Sun Beam—nothing hurts—On A Cold Winter Morning I Walked Back Home: On A Street Paved With Pieces Of Broken Hearts"
 "Single Silver Bullet"
 "Some Days I Stay In Bed For Hours"
 "Schwaltz"
 "The Last One To Fall Asleep With"
 "Night Diving"
 "Liberation #6-Leaving the Memories Behind"

Personnel 
Dougie Bowne – conga programming 
Timo Ellis – guitar, bass
Yuka Honda – drums/sequencer programming, keyboard/sampler
Duma Love – beats, bass, keyboard 
Bill Ware – vibraphone, piano

References

2002 albums
Tzadik Records albums
Yuka Honda albums